Greenan may refer to:

Greenan (surname)

Places
Northern Ireland
Greenan, Aghaderg, a townland in the civil parish of Aghaderg in County Down
Greenan, Bodoney Lower, a townland in the civil parish of Bodoney Lower in County Tyrone
Greenan, County Armagh, a townland in the civil parish of Grange in County Armagh
Greenan, County Fermanagh, a townland in the civil parish of Kinawley in County Fermanagh
Greenan, County Londonderry, a townland in the civil parish of Faughanvale in County Londonderry
Greenan, Culfeightrin, a townland in the civil parish of Culfeightrin in County Antrim
Greenan, Dromore, County Down, a townland in civil parish of Dromore in County Down
Greenan, Dromore, County Tyrone, a townland in the civil parish of Dromore in County Tyrone
Greenan, Duneane, a townland in the civil parish of Duneane in County Antrim
Greenan, Kilskeery, a townland in the civil parish of Kilskeery in County Tyrone
Greenan, Newry, a townland in the civil parish of Newry in County Down
Republic of Ireland
Greenan Mountain, County Donegal
Greenan, County Donegal, a townland in the civil parish of Killymard, County Donegal
Greenan, County Wicklow, a village
Greenan, Kilbeggan, a townland in the civil parish of Kilbeggan, County Westmeath
Greenan, Killucan, a townland in the civil parish of Killucan, County Westmeath
The Greenan, an alternative name for the Grianan of Aileach, an ancient stone-fort atop Greenan Mountain, County Donegal
Scotland
Greenan, South Ayrshire, a settlement in Scotland
Greenan Castle, a castle in Scotland